William C. Sharpless House is a historic home located in the Germantown neighborhood of Philadelphia, Pennsylvania. It was built about 1886, and is a three-story, Wissahickon schist, clapboard and shingle dwelling in the Queen Anne-style.  It features decorative quoining, gable and hipped rooflines, and terra cotta decorative details. A two-story addition was built in the early 1900s. Also on the property is a contributing brick stable with stone quoining.

It was added to the National Register of Historic Places in 1983.

References

Houses on the National Register of Historic Places in Philadelphia
Queen Anne architecture in Pennsylvania
Houses completed in 1886
Germantown, Philadelphia